Eyvashan Seyl (also Romanized as ‘Eyvashān Seyl and ‘Eyvashān Sīl; also known as ‘Eyvashān, Eyvashūn, ‘Eyveshān-e Golestān, and Yebāsūn) is a village in Razan Rural District, Zagheh District, Khorramabad County, Lorestan Province, Iran. At the 2006 census, its population was 223, in 43 families.

References 

Towns and villages in Khorramabad County